Cold roll laminators use a plastic film which is coated with an adhesive and glossy backing which does not adhere to the glue. When the glossy backing is removed, the adhesive is exposed, which then sticks directly onto the item which needs to be laminated. This method, apart from having the obvious benefit of not requiring expensive equipment, is also suitable for those items which would be damaged by heat.   Cold laminators range from simple two roller, hand-crank machines up to large and complex motor-driven machines with high precision rollers, adjustable roller pressure, and other advanced features.

Cold lamination increased in popularity with the rise of wide-format inkjet printers, which often used inks and papers incompatible with hot lamination.  A large percentage of cold laminate for use in the print industry is PVC, although a wide range of other materials are available.  Cold laminating processes are also used outside of the print industry, for example, coating sheet glass or stainless steel with protective films.

Cold roll laminators are also used for laying down adhesive films in the sign-making industry, for example mounting a large print onto a board.  A practiced operator can apply a large adhesive sheet in a fraction of the time it takes to do so by hand.

See also
Lamination
Pouch laminator
Heated roll laminator

Office equipment

de:Lamination
nl:Lamineerapparaat